Acacia speckii is a shrub or tree of the genus Acacia and the subgenus Plurinerves that is endemic to a small area in central western Australia.

Description
Like most species of Acacia it has phyllodes rather than true leaves. The erect and evergreen phyllodes have a threadlike shape and are straight to shallowly incurved and usually bent at the gland. When it blooms it produces simple inflorescences that occur singly or in pairs in the axils with broadly ellipsoid to obloid shaped flower-heads.

Taxonomy
The species was first formally described in 1999 by the botanists Richard Sumner Cowan and Bruce Maslin in 1999 as a part of the work The taxonomy of miscellaneous species with sharply pungent phyllodes in Acacia section Plurinerves (Leguminosae: Mimosoideae) as published in the journal Nuytsia. In 2003 it was reclassified by Leslie Pedley as Racosperma speckii then transferred back to genus Acacia'' in 2006.

Distribution
It is native to an area in the Mid West and Goldfields-Esperance regions of Western Australia where it is commonly situated on rocky rises or hills growing in rocky soils over or around granite, dolerite or basalt. The range of the plant extends from around Meektharra in the north down to around Cue in the south with disjunct populations found further south near Yalgoo where it is usually a part of mulga scrub communities.

See also
 List of Acacia species

References

speckii
Acacias of Western Australia
Taxa named by Bruce Maslin
Taxa named by Richard Sumner Cowan
Plants described in 1999